Aapajärvi is the biggest lake in Tornio, Finland. Aapajärvi is also a village with a population of about 130 (2014). The village is 38 km away from Tornio. People in the village live near the west and north coasts of lake Aapajärvi.

The deepest point of the lake is 4.7 meters and the coastal perimeter is 10.1 kilometers. 

In Finish lapland, there are two Aapajärvi lakes, another is in Pelkosenniemi.

See also
List of lakes in Finland

References
 Finnish Environment Institute: Lakes in Finland
 Etelä-Savon ympäristökeskus: Saimaa, nimet ja rajaukset 

Lakes of Tornio
Tornio